Latchet means the following:

 Pterygotrigla polyommata, a sea robin, a fish species in the genus Pterygotrigla
 a thong, cord or strap fastening the sandal on the foot 

 Latchet bows are small lever action crossbows with the cocking lever built into the top of the stock and a top mounted trigger. Originally used circa 16th century in England.